Neji Jouini (born 12 August 1949) is a former Tunisian football referee. He is known for having refereed three matches in the FIFA World Cup, one in 1990 and two in 1994. Currently, he is the head of the Referees Association of the Qatar Football Association.

References

1949 births
Tunisian football referees
FIFA World Cup referees
1990 FIFA World Cup referees
Living people
1994 FIFA World Cup referees
People from Béja
AFC Asian Cup referees